Studio Sessions, 1957, 1965, 1966, 1967, San Francisco, Chicago, New York is the eighth volume of The Private Collection (published by the Canadian label Unidisc as AGEK 2038) - whereas is Volume 5 in the edition of the collection by the English KAZ Jazz Masters label - a series documenting recordings made by American pianist, composer and bandleader Duke Ellington for his personal collection which was first released on the LMR label in 1987 and later on the Saja label.

Reception
The Allmusic review by Scott Yanow awarded the album 4½ stars and stated the album "features particularly strong moments from trumpeter Cat Anderson, altoist Johnny Hodges and tenorman Paul Gonsalves on many little-played Ellington compositions ".

Track listing
:All compositions by Duke Ellington except as indicated
 "Countdown" - 2:32  
 "When I'm Feeling Kinda Blue" - 5:50  
 "El Viti" (Gerald Wilson) - 3:21  
 "Draggin' Blues" - 6:10  
 "Cotton Tail" - 3:42  
 "Now Ain't It" - 4:16  
 "The Last Go-Round" - 3:32  
 "Moon Mist" - 6:13  
 "Skillipoop" - 2:00  
 "Banquet Scene (Timon of Athens)" - 2:20  
 "Love Scene" (Barer, Ellington)  3:08  
 "Rod la Rocque" - 4:13  
 "Rhythm Section Blues" - 3:09  
 "Lele" - 3:07  
 "Ocht O'Clock Rock" - 3:16  
 "Lady" (Ellington, Irving Mills, Mitchell Parish) - 3:33  
 "Rondolet" - 2:43  
Recorded in Chicago late January 1957 (track 8), at Fine Studios, New York on March 17, 1965 (tracks 9 & 10), at Coast Recorders Studio, San Francisco on April 14, 1965 (tracks 11-13) and August 30, 1965 (tracks 1-3) at RCA Studio B, New York on December 28, 1966 (tracks 4-7) and July 11, 1967 (tracks 14-17).

Personnel
Duke Ellington – piano
Ray Nance -cornet (tracks 9 & 10), trumpet (track 8)
Nat Adderley (tracks 1-3 & 11-13), Cat Anderson, Willie Cook (track 8), Mercer Ellington (tracks 1-3 & 11-17), Herb Jones (tracks 9, 10 & 14-17), Howard McGhee (tracks 9 & 10), Allen Smith (tracks 1-3 & 11-13), Clark Terry (track 8), Cootie Williams (tracks 4-7 & 14-17) - trumpet 
Lawrence Brown (tracks 1-3 & 8-17), Buster Cooper (tracks 1-3 & 8-17), Quentin Jackson (track 8), Britt Woodman (track 8) - trombone
John Sanders - valve trombone (track 8)
Chuck Connors - bass trombone (tracks 1-3 & 8-17)
Jimmy Hamilton - clarinet, tenor saxophone (tracks 1-3 & 8-17)
Russell Procope - alto saxophone, clarinet (tracks 1-3 & 8-17)
Johnny Hodges - alto saxophone 
Paul Gonsalves - tenor saxophone
Harry Carney - baritone saxophone 
John Lamb (track 1-7 & 9-17), Jimmy Woode (track 8)- bass
Louis Bellson (tracks 1-3 & 11-13), Chris Columbus (tracks 14-17), Rufus Jones (tracks 4-7), Sam Woodyard (tracks 8-10) - drums

References

Saja Records albums
Duke Ellington albums
1987 albums